Don Bell may refer to:

 Don Bell (politician) (born 1942), Canadian politician
 Don Bell (broadcaster), American radio broadcaster
 Don Bell (curler), Canadian wheelchair curler